An odd-eyed cat is a cat with one blue eye and one eye either green, yellow, or brown. This is a feline form of complete heterochromia, a condition that occurs in some other animals, including humans. There is also partial heterochromia, where there can be one blue eye and one eye that is partially blue and partially another color. The condition most commonly affects white cats, but may be found in a cat of any color, provided that it possesses the white spotting gene.

Cause
The odd-eyed coloring is caused when either the epistatic (recessive) white gene (which masks any other color genes and turns a cat completely white) or the white spotting gene (which is the gene responsible for bicolor and tuxedo cats) prevents melanin (pigment) granules from reaching one eye during development, resulting in a cat with one blue eye and one green, yellow, or brown eye. The condition only rarely occurs in cats that lack both the dominant white and the white spotting gene.

Kittens
As with some other newborn mammals, all cats are blue-eyed as kittens, and may change as the newborn ages. The differences in an odd-eyed kitten's eye color might not be noticeable, except upon close inspection. Odd-eyed kittens have a different shade of blue in each eye. The color of the odd eye changes over a period of months, for example, from blue to green to yellow or from green to blue to yellow, until it reaches its final, adult color.

Cultural reactions and folklore
Odd-eyed cats are popular within several breeds, including Van cat, Turkish Van, Turkish Angora, Sphynx, Persian, Oriental Shorthair, Japanese Bobtail and Khao Manee. 

In Turkey, Ankara Zoo has a breeding program to preserve pure white Turkish Angora cats with blue and amber eyes. The zoo specifically prized the odd-eyed Angoras who had one blue eye and one amber eye, as the Turkish folklore suggests that "the eyes must be as green as the lake and as blue as the sky". The mascot of the 2010 FIBA World Championship, hosted by Turkey, was an anthropomorphized odd-eyed Van Cat named "Bascat".

Muhammad's pet Angora, Muezza, was reputed to be an odd-eyed cat.  In the Japanese Bobtail, odd-eyed cats are most frequently found in calico individuals.

Deafness in odd-eyed cats

There is a common misconception that all odd-eyed cats are born deaf in one ear. This is not true, as about 60–70% of odd-eyed cats can hear. About 10–20% of normal-eyed cats are born deaf or become deaf as part of the feline aging process. White cats with one or two blue eyes do, however, have a higher incidence of genetic deafness, with the white gene occasionally causing the degeneration of the cochlea, beginning a few days after birth.

Eyeshine and red-eye effect

In flash photographs, odd-eyed cats typically show a red-eye effect in the blue eye, but not in the other eye. This is due to the combined effect of the (normal) presence of a tapetum lucidum in both eyes and the absence of melanin in the blue eye. The tapetum lucidum produces eyeshine in both eyes, but in the non-blue eye a layer of melanin over the tapetum lucidum selectively removes some colors of light.

References

Eye color
Cat body-type mutations
Iris (anatomy)